Aliboron is a genus of beetles in the family Cerambycidae, containing the following species:

 Aliboron antennatum J. Thomson, 1864
 Aliboron bukidnoni Vives, 2005
 Aliboron granulatum Breuning, 1966
 Aliboron laosense Breuning, 1968
 Aliboron wongi Hüdepohl, 1987

References

Agapanthiini